Friedrich Wilhelm Freiherr von Seydlitz (3 February 1721 – 8 November 1773) was a Prussian officer, lieutenant general, and among the greatest of the Prussian cavalry generals.  He commanded one of the first Hussar squadrons of Frederick the Great's army and is credited with the development of the Prussian cavalry to its efficient level of performance in the Seven Years' War. His cavalryman father retired and then died while Seydlitz was still young. Subsequently, he was mentored by Margrave Frederick William of Brandenburg-Schwedt. Seydlitz's superb horsemanship and his recklessness combined to make him a stand-out subaltern, and he emerged as a redoubtable Rittmeister (cavalry captain) in the War of Austrian Succession (1740–1748) during the First and Second Silesian Wars.

Seydlitz became legendary throughout the Prussian Army both for his leadership and for his reckless courage. During the Seven Years' War, he came into his own as a cavalry general, known for his coup d'œil, his ability to assess at a glance the entire battlefield situation and to understand intuitively what needed to be done: he excelled at converting the King's directives into flexible tactics. At the Battle of Rossbach, his cavalry was instrumental in routing the French and Imperial armies. His cavalry subsequently played an important role in crushing the Habsburg and Imperial left flank at the Battle of Leuthen. Seydlitz was wounded in battle several times. After the Battle of Kunersdorf in August 1759, he semi-retired to recover from his wounds, charged with the protection of the city of Berlin.  He was not healthy enough to campaign again until 1761.

Frederick rewarded him with Order of the Black Eagle on the field after the Battle of Rossbach; he had already received the Pour le Mérite for his action at the Battle of Kolin. Although estranged from Frederick for several years, the two were reconciled during Seydlitz's final illness. Seydlitz died in 1773, and Frederick's heirs included his name on the Equestrian statue of Frederick the Great in Berlin, in a place of honor.

Early life
Seydlitz was born on 3 February 1721, in Kalkar in the Duchy of Cleves, where his father, Daniel Florian Seydlitz, was a major of Prussian cavalry with the Cuirassier Regiment Markgraf Friedrich Wilhelm of Brandenburg-Schwedt No. 5. In 1726, his father left military service and moved the family to Schwedt, where he became a forestry master in East Prussia; the senior Seydlitz died in 1728, leaving a widow and children in restricted financial circumstances. Limited schooling was available to young Seydlitz; sources differ whether he knew how to speak and write in French, the lingua franca of Frederick the Great's Court. One biographer, Bernhard von Poten, maintained that his German was good, and if he knew French, he preferred German and wrote it with a "fine, firm hand, unusually correct, in well-formed sentences and with apt expression," and he knew enough Latin to express himself well.  His future sovereign, Frederick, always addressed him in German.

By Seydlitz's seventh year, he could ride a horse well, raced with older boys, and he was, by most accounts, a wild and high-spirited child.  At the age of fourteen he went as a page to the court of the Margrave Frederick Wilhelm of Brandenburg-Schwedt, who had been his father's colonel. The Margrave was a grandson of the Great Elector, and a nephew to both Frederick I of Prussia and Leopold of Anhalt Dessau. Himself a reckless man, the "Mad" Margrave inspired in young Seydlitz a passion for feats of daredevil horsemanship.  Seydlitz did not limit this passion to horses: the Margrave once dared him to ride a wild stag, which he did. Seydlitz became a skilled horseman, and many stories tell of his feats, the best known of which involved riding between the sails of a windmill in full swing. Seydlitz remained in his position as a page to the Margrave until King Frederick William appointed him as cornet in the Margrave's Cuirassier Regiment No. 5 (his father's old regiment) on 13 February 1740.

Military career

Seydlitz's first months as a cornet were made difficult by the regimental colonel, who considered him a spy for the Margrave, and abused him by sending him on useless errands and generally making it clear that the cornet was no match for the colonel. Within a year of Seydlitz's commission, the old King Frederick William died and his son, Frederick II of Prussia, ascended to the throne.  Frederick claimed Silesia from the Habsburg's Maria Theresa, and made a broad appeal to arms.  The Margrave's regiment played an important role in the ensuing war, during which Seydlitz came to the notice of the King several times. Once, when Frederick asked the caliber of the artillery shelling the Prussian line, opinions were divided and vague. Seydlitz rode in front of the battery, halting in their line of fire. When he saw a ball hit the ground, he picked it up, wrapped it in his handkerchief and presented it to the King.

In May 1742, while stationed with his regiment in Kranowitz during the First Silesian War, the regimental colonel ordered him to take 30 men and hold a village post until infantry came to his assistance; despite heavy fire, the grudging colonel did not send reinforcements.  Realizing what had happened, the brigade's general took three squadrons of heavy cavalry to relieve Seydlitz, but these were turned back by fire from the Austrian line. Subsequently, Seydlitz was forced to surrender his small unit. He entered into Austrian captivity with several of his closest comrades, including Charles de Warnery.

Frederick exchanged an Austrian captain for Cornet Seydlitz. Upon his return from captivity, Seydlitz had a choice to wait for the first lieutenancy that became available in a cuirassier regiment, or take the immediate command of a troop of hussars, as a captain.  Hussars were the newest form of service in the Prussian army, and not as prestigious an assignment as cuirassiers, but Seydlitz chose the immediate promotion to a lesser unit.  In 1743, the King made him a Rittmeister (captain) in the 4th Hussars. He entirely skipped the rank of lieutenant.  With the 4th Hussars, he was stationed in the city of Trebnitz and he brought his squadron to a state of conspicuous efficiency.

In August 1744, the King entered Bohemia, took Prague, and then moved south. Lieutenant General Count Nassau led the vanguard, and Seydlitz participated with the Natzmer Hussars, commanded by Major Hans Heinrich Adam Schütz, a violent man of whose conduct of warfare Seydlitz disapproved. Seydlitz served through the Second Silesian War. On 22 May, Hans Karl von Winterfeldt, trusted by the King as a good judge of character, reported to Frederick: "Certainly, at Hohenfriedberg, on the 4 June, [Seydlitz] captured the Saxon general [Georg Sigismund] von Schlichting personally, after he had cut the reins from him." Based largely on his conduct at Hohenfriedberg and Winterfeldt's recommendation, Frederick promoted Seydlitz to major on 28 July at the unusually young age of twenty-four.

Seydlitz led his squadron at the Battle of Soor on 30 September, scouting the enemy's position before the battle, and then participating in the action.  He was also present in the engagement at Katholisch-Hennersdorf on 23 November, which proved convincingly to Frederick the benefit of close support during a cavalry charge. At the successful action on 27 November, Seydlitz led 15 squadrons in an attack on the Austrian rear guard. The Austrians were dispersed and nearly destroyed.

Development of cavalry tactics

After Frederick concluded the peace on 25 December 1748, Seydlitz returned with his squadron to Trebnitz. In the subsequent years of peace, Seydlitz developed flexible cavalry tactics. He assembled a plan on tactical form and training for the Prussian cavalry and presented it to the King.  Frederick approved the procedures and Seydlitz established a rigorous training program. He would leave his own estate by jumping the gate; he required similar horsemanship from all his men, regardless of whether they were cuirassiers, hussars or dragoons. They had to be capable of galloping across broken fields, wheeling in formation, and riding in close action. Furthermore, they had to be prepared to support any movement of infantry, or to react to any action from the enemy. Under Seydlitz's direction, Prussian cavalry learned to use only their swords, as pistols or carbines could not be fired with accuracy and had to be reloaded. Frederick set up straw dummies for his troopers to shoot; their shots were woefully inaccurate, but Seydlitz's tactics demonstrated that the troopers could hit their target with a sword every time. Generally, cavalry horses were the sturdy warm-blood Trakehners, from Frederick's stud farm in Trakenhen, East Prussia.

On 21 September 1752, after a successful review in which the different cavalry forms demonstrated their competencies, the King promoted Seydlitz to lieutenant colonel and the commander-in-chief of cavalry and, on 13 October of the same year, to the commander of the Dragoon Regiment Württemberg No. 12, whose staff was at Treptow. Frederick was not satisfied with the regiment's performance, and instructed Seydlitz to "put it back into order". In 1753 Frederick appointed Seydlitz to the command of the 8th Cuirassiers. In Seydlitz's hands, this regiment soon became a model for the rest of the Prussian Army's mounted force. In 1755 Frederick promoted him to colonel.

By the start of the Seven Years' War, Seydlitz's transformed cavalry had become Frederick's pride and joy: it had unrivaled training and an esprit de corps bolstered by Frederick's confidence in its members, and by their confidence in Seydlitz. The King had issued orders that no Prussian cavalryman would allow himself to be attacked without a commensurate response, under penalty of being cashiered; consequently, Prussian cavalrymen were active, impetuous and aggressive. For the King, Seydlitz's cavalry became the dynamic factor in the army of the state, and would be the tool by which Frederick could challenge empires. In 1756, Seydlitz's cavalry became Frederick's weapon of choice.

Seven Years' War

In May 1757, in defiance of the custom of holding the heavy cavalry in reserve, Seydlitz brought his regiment forward to join the advance guard at the Battle of Prague. Here he nearly lost his life attempting to ride through a marshy pool; his horse became stuck in quicksand and his troopers pulled him away. At the Prussian loss at Kolin in June 1757, he and a cavalry brigade checked the Austrian pursuit by a brilliant charge. Two days later, the King promoted him to major general and awarded him the Pour le Mérite. Seydlitz felt he had deserved the promotion for a long time, for he responded to Hans Joachim von Zieten's congratulations by saying, "It was high time, Excellency, if they wanted more work out of me. I am already thirty-six."

Another example of his leadership and his coup d'œil, the ability to see at a glance what needed to be done, occurred after the Battle of Kolin. The loss at Kolin forced the King to lift the siege at Prague. The King's brother, Augustus William, took command of the army and ordered the retreat from Prague. Seydlitz was attached to the advanced corps of Karl Christoph von Schmettau in a brigade of ten squadrons. As Seydlitz's wing entered Lusatia, near the town of Zittau, the Austrians were present in force, and Seydlitz with his squadrons were trapped in the town. Tricking the Austrians into thinking his troop was a foraging party, his cavalry burst on the Austrian cavalry before they could climb into their saddles. Seydlitz led his cavalry in an escape, in close column, and was quickly out of sight.

Battle of Rossbach
On the morning of the Battle of Rossbach, Frederick passed over two senior generals and placed Seydlitz in command of the whole of the cavalry, much to those men's annoyance and to Seydlitz's satisfaction. At Rossbach, Seydlitz's coup d'œil and his understanding of the King's objectives led to battlefield success.  After positioning the cavalry in two ranked lines, he watched the French army move for several minutes, while puffing on his pipe; his troopers never took their eyes off him.  When he threw his pipe away, this was the signal they had waited for: the first line of massed squadrons surged forward, smashing the unprepared French in the flank. Typically, cavalry action in the mid-eighteenth century meant a single cavalry charge; the cavalry would spend the rest of the action pursuing fleeing troops. At Rossbach, though, not content with this single attack, Seydlitz called his second formation of squadrons in another charge; he then withdrew all 38 squadrons into a copse, where they regrouped under cover of the trees.  Without waiting for new orders from the King, Seydlitz deployed the Prussian cavalry a third time; this proved a critical factor in the battle. As trained, Seydlitz's squadrons charged headlong into the French columns: a massive wall of horses galloping flank to flank, their riders flashing swords and maneuvering at full speed. By the end of the battle, only seven infantry battalions of Frederick's army had fired a shot; the rest of the victory had been the work of Seydlitz's 38 squadrons and Karl Friedrich von Moller's artillery.

That day, the Prussians took as trophies 72 cannons (62 percent of the French/Imperial artillery), seven flags, and 21 standards. With some 3,500 horsemen and 20 cannons, plus a portion of Prince Henry's regiment of infantry, the Prussian army had defeated the combined armies of two European powers, France and the Holy Roman Empire. The tactics at Rossbach became a landmark in the history of military art. The same night, on the field, the King awarded Seydlitz the Order of the Black Eagle, and promoted him to lieutenant general. Seydlitz had been wounded during the melée and he remained out of action for four months, nursed by a lady in Leipzig.

Campaign 1758–59
Seydlitz rejoined the King in 1758 and on 25 August, at the Battle of Zorndorf, Seydlitz's cavalry again secured the victory. He led thirty-six squadrons into a mass of Russian cavalry mingled with infantry. This charge broke the Russian right wing and sent them running for the woods. At the Prussian debacle at Hochkirch, on 14 October 1758, he covered the Prussian retreat with 108 squadrons, and in the disaster of Kunersdorf, on 12 August 1759, he received another severe wound in a hopeless attempt to storm a hill held by the Russians; his 8th Cuirassiers was one of the few intact regiments at the end of the battle. While recuperating in Berlin, he helped organize a defense of the city during the Austro-Russian raid (October 1760). Although he was unable to prevent the Russians from briefly occupying the city, Frederick later praised Seydlitz for his conduct.

Seydlitz's health frequently kept him off the battlefield, and he did not reappear at the front until 1761. Then, he received command of a wing of Prince Henry's army, composed of troops of all arms, and many of his fellow officers expressed doubts as to his fitness for this command, as his service had been with the cavalry exclusively. Subsequently, though, at Freiberg on 29 October 1762, his direction of both his infantry and his cavalry in turn decided the outcome of the battle.

Later life

After the Seven Years' War concluded with the Treaty of Hubertusburg (1763), Seydlitz became inspector general of the cavalry in Silesia, where eleven regiments were permanently stationed and where Frederick sent all his most promising officers to be trained. In 1767, Frederick promoted Seydlitz to general of cavalry.

Seydlitz's later years were marred by domestic unhappiness. During his convalescence in Berlin, on 18 April 1761, he had married Susannah Johanna Albertine Hacke, daughter of Hans Christoph Friedrich Graf von Hacke, and she was eventually unfaithful to him, reportedly due to the syphilis from which he had suffered for decades.  He had at least one daughter, according to an early biographer, Anton König, and two according to another biographer, Robert Lawley. The oldest daughter married first to an official from Breslau, and was divorced.  She married second to a Polish count, and divorced soon after. She eventually converted to Catholicism, but died in a madhouse in Brieg. The youngest lived to old age and died in poverty near Lausitz.

By the end of the decade, some misunderstanding brought an end to his formerly close friendship with the King. Seydlitz's health had been declining for years and he suffered from recurrent bouts of syphilis; in 1772, after an attack of apoplexy, he completed a couple of stays at the spa at Carlsbad to take the mineral waters. While these helped somewhat, his other activities continued without moderation, and to his detriment. A subordinate brought him two healthy Circassian beauties, whose company he enjoyed but who undoubtedly stressed his tenuous health. In August 1773, in his last illness, Frederick and Seydlitz met again at Seydlitz's home at Minkovsky near Ohlau (now Oława, Poland). The King sat beside his sickbed, horrified at Seydlitz's condition, and even persuaded him to take some of his medications, but Seydlitz would not look at him; the illness had already deformed his face.  Eventually paralyzed, whether from another stroke or the underlying tertiary syphilis, Seydlitz died at Ohlau in Silesia in November 1773.

Character
Seydlitz was generally admired for the superb coup d'œil that allowed him to utilize the cavalry to its full potential. His 19th-century biographer, K. A. Varnhagen von Ense, related that Seydlitz lived above all for the service, and promoted the training of his hussars before all else. According to Anton Balthasar König, who wrote in 1780–1790, Seydlitz performed best at taverns and excelled in practical jokes: one would gather that Seydlitz was a drunkard, a rake, and a savage, but another of his biographers, Bernhard von Poten, cited conflicting descriptions offered by Seydlitz's contemporaries, particularly Warnery, as more accurate. Nevertheless, there is some evidence to support König's assertion, at least of Seydlitz's excesses: Seydlitz was no doubt dependent upon his tobacco and had been since his teenage years, although he smoked a pipe rather than using snuff, as many officers did; he was indeed reckless, as his career testified; he enjoyed the company of women; and Seydlitz indeed suffered from recurring illness.

Memorials

In 1851, Frederick William IV, Frederick's great-great nephew, included Seydlitz's name on the Equestrian statue of Frederick the Great in Berlin, honoring those who had helped to build the Prussian state. Seydlitz holds a position of honor as one of the four full-sized mounted figures, sharing the first tier of the plinth with the King's brother, his cousin, and Hans Joachim von Zieten. A bronze sculpture installed at Wilhelmplatz, in Berlin, was created by Anton Lulvès, a copper worker from Hamburg. , representing the first generation of battlecruisers, was ordered in 1910 and commissioned in May 1913, the fourth such vessel built for the Imperial German Navy's High Seas Fleet.

References

Notes

Citations

Resources

Further reading

External links

 Google Maps. Seydlitz Strasse in Reichertswerben. April 2017.
 Reichertswerben village. 03. – 05. November 2017, Biwak in Reichardtswerben, anlässlich des 260. Jahrestages der Schlacht bei Roßbach, Diorama. Accessed 8 November 2017.

1721 births
1773 deaths
Barons of Germany
Cavalry commanders
Deaths from syphilis
Generals of Cavalry (Prussia)
Military personnel from North Rhine-Westphalia
People from Kleve (district)
People from the Duchy of Cleves
People of the Silesian Wars
Prussian military personnel of the Seven Years' War
Recipients of the Pour le Mérite (military class)